Long Range may refer to:

Long range shooting, a collective term for shooting at such long distances that various atmospheric conditions becomes equally important as pure shooting skills
Long Range Aviation, a branch of the Soviet Air Forces
Long-range dependency
Long Range Mountains
Long-range order
Long-range penetration
Long-range surveillance
Long-range Wi-Fi

Other uses
Long Range (G.I. Joe), a fictional character in the G.I. Joe universe